Patrice Pluyette (born 5 September 1977 in Chevreuse) is a French writer.

Biography 
After studying modern letters at the Sorbonne and a master's degree on Eugène Ionesco (Le Merveilleux dans l’œuvre théâtrale de Ionesco), Pluyette interrupted the competitions for teaching in 2002 and devoted himself to writing. In 2004, he chose to settle down by the sea in Morbihan.

He subsequently published three novels at Éditions du Seuil:  (2006),  (2008) nominated for the Prix Goncourt and the Prix Médicis, and Un été sur le Magnifique ( 2011).

In October 2008, the  bestowed him the Prix Amerigo Vespucci for his novel La Traversée du Mozambique par temps calme.

In November 2008, he was awarded the Prix Pierre-Mac Orlan, chaired by Pierre Bergé, for the same novel.

In 2010-2011 Patrice Pluyette was resident at the Villa Médicis at Rome.

His latest novel, La fourmi assassine, was published on 8 January 2015 at éditions du Seuil. It was selected for the Grand prix RTL-Lire and the Prix Alexandre Vialatte.

Works

Novels 
 2004: Les Béquilles, Éditions Maurice Nadeau,  
 2005: Un vigile, Éditions Maurice Nadeau
 2006: Blanche, Seuil,  
 2008: La Traversée du Mozambique par temps calme, Seuil series Point,  
 2011: Un été sur le Magnifique, Seuil,  
 2015: La Fourmi assassine, Seuil,

Poetry 
2001: Décidément Rien, Éditions-Galerie Racine

References

External links 
 Official website
 Patrice Pluyette on Babelio
 Le polar dégoupillé de Patrice Pluyette on Le Point (13 January 2015)
 La Fourmi assassine on Éditions du Seuil
 Patrice Pluyette - La fourmi assassine on YouTube

21st-century French non-fiction writers
People from Yvelines
1977 births
Living people